The Ministry of Interior of Republika Srpska (Serbo-Croatian: Министарство унутрашњих послова Републике Српске (МУП РС) / Ministarstvo unutrašnjih poslova Republike Srpske (MUP RS)) is the interior ministry of the Republika Srpska.

Description
The police are under the direct control of the MUP RS. The duties of the police are protecting the rights of all its citizens, preventing and responding to disasters and other emergency situations, and maintaining law and order in society and amongst the civil population. Counter-terrorism branches of the police are tasked with anti-terrorist operations and high profile apprehensions. The police have their main headquarters in Banja Luka, but police academies are situated in Pale, Prijedor, and Bijeljina.

CPT report
The Council of Europe's Committee for the Prevention of Torture (CPT) has been critical of law enforcement and prison conditions in Republika Srpska, stating that "ill-treatment by the police remains a frequent occurrence and that little, if any, progress has been made" and that "It should be emphasised that some of the ill-treatment alleged was of such severity that it would amount to torture."

List of ministers

See also 
 Police of Republika Srpska
 Government of Republika Srpska

Notes

References

External links
Ministry of Interior of Republika Srpska
Government

Politics of Republika Srpska
Law enforcement agencies of Bosnia and Herzegovina
Organizations based in Republika Srpska
1992 establishments in Bosnia and Herzegovina